Sue Lost in Manhattan, also known as Sue, is a  1997 American drama film directed by Amos Kollek.

Synopsis 
Desperately alone, Sue wanders around New York City. From episodic companionships to unsuccessful job searches, distraught, she lets herself slowly be engulfed by a cold and aggressive city.

Cast 
 Anna Thomson as Sue
 Matthew Powers as Ben
 Tahnee Welch as Lola
 Tracee Ellis Ross as Linda
 John Ventimiglia as Larry
 Edoardo Ballerini as Eddie
 Matthew Faber as Sven
 Austin Pendleton as Bob
 Robert Kya-Hill as Willie

References

External links
 

1997 films
1997 drama films
Films set in New York City
American drama films
Films directed by Amos Kollek
1990s American films